Port Clyde may refer to:

 Port Clyde, Maine
 Port Clyde, Nova Scotia

See also
 Clyde Port Authority; see The Peel Group